Gagetown is a 2009 documentary film that looks into the massive defoliant spray program that was used at CFB Gagetown since 1956. The chemical herbicides used include
50/50 mixtures of 2,4-D/ 2,4,5-T, and Tordon 101, also known as Agent Orange and Agent White.

These chemicals have been known to produce extremely toxic byproducts, including dioxins and hexachlorobenzenes.

Exposure to these byproducts has been linked to increased cases in cancer and blood diseases, especially non-Hodgkin lymphoma and leukemia.

According to a Canadian Department of National Defence document acquired through the Access to Information Act, over 3.2 million liters and kilograms of chemical defoliants 
were used at the base between the years 1956 to 1984.

Press
 Article by Shawn Berry, The Daily Gleaner, March 9, 2009
 Article by Benjamin Shingler, Telegraph Journal, March 28, 2009
 Article by Kate Horodyski, Capital News Online, April 3, 2009

External links
Official website

2009 films
2009 documentary films
American documentary films
Documentary films about environmental issues
2000s English-language films
2000s American films
English-language documentary films